Henry Stockbridge Jr. (September 18, 1856 – March 22, 1924) was a U.S. Representative from Maryland.

Born in Baltimore, Maryland, Stockbridge attended public and private schools and Williston Academy of Easthampton, Massachusetts.  He graduated from Amherst College in 1877, where he was a member of the Chi Phi Fraternity.  He attended law school at the University of Maryland at Baltimore and graduated in 1878.  He was admitted to the bar in the latter year and commenced practice in Baltimore. He was also employed on the editorial staff of the Baltimore Herald and later with the Baltimore American.  He was appointed as an examiner in equity by the supreme bench of Baltimore in December 1882.

Stockbridge was elected as a Republican to the Fifty-first Congress (March 4, 1889 – March 3, 1891), but declined to be a candidate for renomination in 1890. Afterwards, he served as United States commissioner of immigration for the port of Baltimore from 1891 to 1893.

He was a member of the Sons of the American Revolution and the General Society of Colonial Wars.

Stockbridge was elected judge of the supreme bench of Baltimore in November 1896 and served until 1911, and was a Regent of the University of Maryland from 1907 to 1920.  He was appointed judge of the Maryland Court of Appeals on April 13, 1911, and was elected in November 1911 for a term of fifteen years.  He died in Baltimore, and is interred in Loudon Park National Cemetery.

References

External links 
 

1856 births
1924 deaths
Politicians from Baltimore
Republican Party members of the United States House of Representatives from Maryland
Judges of the Maryland Court of Appeals
Maryland lawyers
American newspaper editors
Williston Northampton School alumni
Amherst College alumni
University of Maryland, Baltimore alumni
University of Maryland, College Park faculty
19th-century American lawyers